Swami Vivekananda was a Hindu monk from India. His teachings and philosophy are a reinterpretation and synthesis of various strands of Hindu thought, most notably classical yoga and (Advaita) Vedanta, with western esotericism and Universalism. He blended religion with nationalism, and applied this reinterpretation to various aspect's of education, faith, character building as well as social issues pertaining to India. His influence extended also to the west, and he was instrumental in introducing Yoga to the west.

Advaita Vedanta

Influences
Vivekananda was influenced by the Brahmo Samaj and western Universalism and esotericism, and by his guru Ramakrishna, who regarded the Absolute and the relative reality to be nondual aspects of the same integral reality.

Western esoterism
While synthesizing and popularizing various strands of Hindu-thought, most notably classical yoga and (Advaita) Vedanta, Vivekananda was influenced by western ideas such as Universalism, via Unitarian missionaries who collaborated with the Brahmo Samaj. His initial beliefs were shaped by Brahmo concepts, which included belief in a formless God and the deprecation of idolatry, and a "streamlined, rationalized, monotheistic theology strongly coloured by a selective and modernistic reading of the Upanisads and of the Vedanta". He propagated the idea that "the divine, the absolute, exists within all human beings regardless of social status", and that "seeing the divine as the essence of others will promote love and social harmony". Via his affiliations with Keshub Chandra Sen's Nava Vidhan, the Freemasonry lodge, the Sadharan Brahmo Samaj, and Sen's Band of Hope, Vivekananda became acquainted with Western esotericism.

Ramakrishna
In 1881 Narendra first met Ramakrishna, who became his spiritual focus after his own father had died in 1884. According to Banhatti, it was Ramakrishna who really answered Narendra's question who had really seen God, by saying "Yes, I saw Him as I see you, only in an infinitely intenser sense." Ramakrishna gradually brought Narendra to a Vedanta-based worldview that "provides the ontological basis for 'śivajñāne jīver sevā', the spiritual practice of serving human beings as actual manifestations of God." According to Michael Taft, Ramakrishna reconciled the dualism of form and formless, regarding the Supreme Being to be both Personal and Impersonal, active and inactive. Ramakrishna stated that
 Nevertheless, Vivekananda was more influenced by the Brahmo Samaj's and its new ideas, than by Ramakrishna.

AdvaitaVedanta
Adhikārivāda in Hinduism, claimed special rights and privileges with regard to the right to universal knowledge of the Upanishads. Vivekananda rejected Adhikārivāda which, in his view, was the outcome of pure selfishness and ignored both the infinite possibilities of the human soul and the fact that all men are capable of receiving knowledge if it is imparted in their own respective languages. He claimed, there is no reason for access to the universal knowledge of the Upanishads to be restricted on the basis of caste or religion.

Vivekananda propagated that the essence of Hinduism was best expressed in Adi Shankara's Advaita Vedanta philosophy. Nevertheless, following Ramakrishna, and in contrast to Advaita Vedanta, Vivekananda believed that the Absolute is both immanent and transcendent. According to Anil Sooklal, Vivekananda's neo-Vedanta "reconciles Dvaita or dualism and Advaita or non-dualism," viewing Brahman as "one without a second," yet "both qualified, saguna, and qualityless, nirguna." Vivekananda summarised the Vedanta as follows, giving it a modern and Universalistic interpretation, showing the influence of classical yoga:

Yoga and Samkhya
Vivekananda's emphasis on nirvikalpa samadhi was preceded by medieval yogic influences on Advaita Vedanta. In line with Advaita Vedanta texts like Dŗg-Dŗśya-Viveka (14th century) and Vedantasara (of Sadananda) (15th century), Vivekananda saw samadhi as a means to attain liberation.

Vivekananda popularized the notion of involution, a term which Vivekananda probably took from western Theosophists, notably Helena Blavatsky, in addition to Darwin's notion of evolution, and possibly referring to the Samkhya term sātkarya. Theosophic ideas on involution has "much in common" with "theories of the descent of God in Gnosticism, Kabbalah, and other esoteric schools." According to Meera Nanda, "Vivekananda uses the word involution exactly how it appears in Theosophy: the descent, or the involvement, of divine consciousness into matter." With spirit, Vivekananda refers to prana or purusha, derived ("with some original twists") from Samkhya and classical yoga as presented by Patanjali in the Yoga sutras.

Vivekananda linked morality with control of the mind, seeing truth, purity and unselfishness as traits which strengthened it. He advised his followers to be holy, unselfish and to have shraddhā (faith). Vivekananda supported brahmacharya, believing it the source of his physical and mental stamina and eloquence.

Indian nationalism and personal development
Nationalism was a prominent theme in Vivekananda's thought. He believed that a country's future depends on its people, and his teachings focused on human development. He wanted "to set in motion a machinery which will bring noblest ideas to the doorstep of even the poorest and the meanest".

Nationalism
Vivekananda played a major role in the growing Indian nationalist sentiments in the late 19th and the 20th century, encouraging many Indians with his success and appeal in the West. His example helped to build pride in India's cultural and religious heritage, and supported the Indian independence movement. Vivekananda participated in several of these movements, calling for Indian independence from British rule. Swami Vivekananda believed that India is the blessed punyabhumi, the "land of virtue":

According to Vivekananda, a country's future depends on its people, stating that "man-making is my mission." Religion plays a central role in this man-making, stating "to preach unto mankind their divinity, and how to make it manifest in every movement of life." It is coordinated willpower that would lead to independence, even with forty millions Britons ruling three hundred million people in India. According to Vivekananda, those forty million Britons put their wills together and that resulted infinite power, and that was the reason of their success. Vivekananda prescribed, to make a great future India the whole serest will lie in organization, accumulation of power, co-ordination of wills.

Personal development and religion
In line with the influence of western ideas, Vivekananda stressed the importance of individual development. Swami Vivekananda realized three things are necessary to make every man great, every nation great, namely conviction of the powers of goodness; absence of jealousy and suspicion; and helping all who are trying to be and do good. Swami Vivekananda suggested trying to give up jealousy and conceit and learn to work unitedly for others. He told that purity, patience and perseverance overcome all obstacles. He suggested taking courage and work on. Patience and steady work, according to Swami Vivekananda, this is the only way to get success.

According to Swami Vivekananda, "faith in ourselves and faith in God- this is the secret of greatness". Swami Vivekananda observed the history of the world is the history of a few men who had faith in themselves, and it is faith which calls out divinity within. So he told, if people have faith in three hundred and thirty millions of Hindu mythological gods, and in all the gods which foreigners have now and still have no faith in themselves, there will be no salvation. To Vivekananda, religion was not mere theory, but an actual practice to be applied in life, raising the brute into man, and man into God, stating "it is being and becoming, not hearing or acknowledging; it is the whole soul becoming changed into what it believes." He hated the religious rituals that were in practice during that time. Vivekananda also noted that meditation in isolation won't suffice:

Society

Social service
Social service was an essential aspect of Vivekananda's ideas, and an innovation which deviated from both Advaita Vedanta and Ramakrishna. He nevertheless attributed these ideas to both, trying to reconcile them with his own ideas.

According to Vivekananda, an important teaching he received from Ramakrishna was that Jiva is Shiva (each individual is divinity itself). So he stressed on Shiva Jnane Jiva Seva, (to serve common people considering them as manifestation of God). According to Vivekananda, man is potentially Divine, so, service to man is indeed service to God.

Non-injury
Swami Vivekananda called Jain monks the first great ascetics. He praised their ancient knowledge of presence of low form of life in water:

Caste System 

He emphasized that the caste system was not by birth as per ancient Hindu traditions. It is more about social structure i.e. by profession where a child born in a Kshatriya family can become Brahmin also. A striking contrast was noticed in the idea of Vivekananda regarding the caste system. Strangely enough, he supported the Varna system as described in the Vedas. Unfolding the advantages of the caste system, he told that division of labour is a great blessing of this system. It would lead to excellence in any profession.

This division, of course, will lead to a caste on the path of progress. However, he also exposed the evils of this system. Untouchability was its worst part. So, Vivekananda criticized this type of “Don’t touches”. He wanted to curb out this type of dogmatism from the society.

Education
Vivekananda believed education is the manifestation of perfection already in men. He thought it is a pity that the existing system of education did not enable a person to stand on his own feet, nor did it teach him self-confidence and self-respect. To Vivekananda, education was not only collection of information, but something more meaningful; he felt education should be man-making, life giving and character-building. To him, education was an assimilation of noble ideas.

Swami Vivekananda felt that the education that young boys and girls receive is very negative. He thinks they do not gain confidence or self-respect from this education, so according to Swami Vivekananda only positive education should be given to children. Swami Vivekananda told, if young boys and girls are encouraged and are not unnecessarily criticized all the time, they are bound to improve in time.  He also told the youth:

Womanhood
Swami Vivekananda warned it is completely unfair to discriminate between sexes, as there is not any sex distinction in Ātman ('self', 'essence'), the soul has neither sex, nor caste nor imperfection. He suggested not to think that there are men and women, but only that there are human beings. Swami Vivekananda felt, The best thermometer to the progress of a nation is its treatment of its women and it is impossible to get back India's lost pride and honor unless they try to better the condition of women. Vivekananda considered men and women as two wings of a bird, and it is not possible for a bird to fly on only one wing. So, according to him, there is no chance for the welfare of the world unless the condition of woman is improved.

Swami Vivekananda noticed almost everywhere women are treated as playthings. In modern countries like America, women have more independence, still, Vivekananda had noticed, men bow low, offer a woman a chair and in another breath they offer compliments like "Oh, how beautiful your eyes.." etc. Vivekananda felt, a man does not have any right to do this or venture so far, and any woman should not permit this as well. According to Swami Vivekananda, such things develop the less noble side of humanity. They do not tend to noble ideals.

According to Vivekananda, the ideal of womanhood in India is motherhood – that marvelous, unselfish, all-suffering, ever-forgiving mother. Vivekananda felt, in India, there are two great evils – trampling on the women, and grinding through the poor through caste restrictions.

According to Swami Vivekananda, Sita is typical of India – the idealized India. Swami Vivekananda assured if world literature of the past and world literature of the future are thoroughly exhausted, yet, it will not be possible to find another Sita, because Sita is unique, the character was depicted once for all. Swami Vivekananda felt there may have been several Ramas, perhaps, but never more than one Sita. Sita was a true Indian by nature, Vivekananda concluded, one who never returned an injury.

Influence on western spirituality
Vivekananda's acquaintance with Western esotericism made him very successful in Western esoteric circles, beginning with his speech in 1893 at the Parliament of Religions. Vivekananda adapted traditional Hindu ideas and religiosity to suit the needs and understandings of his Western audiences, who were especially attracted by and familiar with Western esoteric traditions and movements like Transcendentalism and New thought. An important element in his adaptation of Hindu religiosity was the introduction of his four yoga's model, which includes Raja yoga, his interpretation of Patanjali's Yoga sutras, which offered a practical means to realize the divine force within which is central to modern Western esotericism. In 1896 his book Raja Yoga was published, which became an instant success and was highly influential in the Western understanding of yoga.

See also

 Bibliography of Swami Vivekananda
 Self-control
 Yoga
 Ashtanga yoga
 Bhakti yoga
 Karma yoga
 Jnana yoga

Notes

References

Sources

 
 
 

 
 

 

 
 

 

 
 

 
 
 

 

 
 

 
 
 

 

 

Advaitin philosophers
Philosophical theories
Swami Vivekananda